The 1966 anti-Igbo pogrom was a series of massacres committed against Igbo people and other people of southern Nigerian origin living in northern Nigeria starting in May 1966 and reaching a peak after 29 September 1966. Between 8,000 and 30,000 Igbos and easterners have been estimated to have been killed. A further 1 million Igbos fled the Northern Region into the East. In response to the killings some northerners were massacred in Port Harcourt and other eastern cities. These events led to the secession of the eastern Nigerian region and the declaration of the Republic of Biafra, which ultimately led to the Nigeria-Biafra war.

Background 
The events took place in the context of military coups d'etat and in the prelude to the Nigerian Civil War. The immediate precursor to the massacres was the January 1966 Nigerian coup d'etat led mostly by young Igbo officers. Most of the politicians and senior army officers killed by them were northerners because Northerners were the majority in Nigeria's government, including Prime Minister Abubakar Tafawa Balewa and Ahmadu Bello the Sardauna of Sokoto. The coup was opposed by other senior army officers. An Igbo officer, Aguiyi-Ironsi stopped the coup in Lagos while another Igbo officer, Emeka Ojukwu stopped the coup in the north. Aguiyi-Ironsi then assumed power, forcing the civilian government to cede authority. He established a military government led by himself as supreme commander. In the months following the coup, it was widely noted that four of the five army Majors who executed the coup were Igbo and that the General who took over power was also Igbo. Northerners feared that the Igbo had set out to take control of the country. In a response action Northern officers carried out the July 1966 Nigerian counter-coup in which 240 Southern members of the army were systematically killed, three-quarters of them Igbo, as well as thousands of civilians of southern origin living in the north. In the aftermath, Yakubu Gowon, a northerner, assumed command of the military government. In this background, increased ethnic rivalries led to further massacres.

The massacres were widely spread in the north and peaked on 29 May, 29 July, and 29 September 1966. By the time the pogrom ended, virtually all Igbos of the North were dead, hiding among sympathetic Northerners or on their way to the Eastern region. The massacres were led by the Nigerian Army and replicated in various Northern Nigerian cities. Although Colonel Gowon was issuing guarantees of safety to Southern Nigerians living in the North, the intention of a large portion of the Nigerian army at the time was genocidal as was the common racist rhetoric among Tiv, Idoma, Hausa, and other Northern Nigerian tribes. With the exception of a few Northern Nigerians (mainly army officers who were not convinced that Igbo were innately evil), the Southern and Eastern Nigerians were generally regarded at the time in the North of Nigeria as described by Charles Keil:

Northern Nigerians were however also targeted in the Igbo dominated Eastern Nigeria. Thousands of Hausas, Tiv and other Northern Tribes were massacred by Igbo mobs, forcing a mass exodus of Northerners from the Eastern Region.

Non-Igbo Eastern minorities and Midwesterners in the North were also attacked as there were no ways to differentiate them from Igbos by appearance, who were all collectively known by the name "Yameri" in the North.

One factor that led to the hostility toward Southern Nigerians in general and Igbo in particular was the attempt by the Aguiyi Ironsi regime to abolish regionalisation in favor of a unitary system of government which was regarded as a plot to establish Igbo domination in the Federation. On 24 May 1966 Ironsi issued a unitary decree, which led to an explosion of attacks against the Igbo in Northern Nigeria on 29 May 1966. The British press was unanimous in its conviction at the time that these 29 May killings were organized and not spontaneous. The Ironsi regime was also perceived to have been favoring Southern Nigerians in the appointment to key positions in government, thus heightening the inter ethnic rivalries.

The failure of the Ironsi regime to punish the army mutineers responsible for the January 1966 coup further exacerbated the situation. The May 1966 pogrom was carried out by rampaging mobs with the connivance of local government. The unprofessional attitude of some elements of the international press are also known to have added to the existing tension. J.D.F. Jones, the diplomatic correspondent of the Financial Times had on 17 January 1966 already predicted that the Northerners might "already have begun to take revenge for the death of their leader the Sardauna of Sokoto on the large number of Igbo who live in the North", which at the time they were not doing. This has been criticized as an irresponsible and for a journalist unprofessional, self-fulfilling prophecy which would lead the Northern elite to assume that the Financial Times was in possession of information that they were not aware of, and that the world expected the North to react in this way. Later tactics were engineered by Northern elites to provoke violence such as fabricated news stories submitted to radio Cotonou and relayed by the Hausa service of the BBC detailing exaggerated attacks against Northerners in the East, which led to the furious killings of Eastern Nigerians on 29 September 1966.

According to British newspaper reports at the time, about 30,000 Igbo were killed in September 1966, while more conservative estimates put the casualties at between ten and thirty thousand for that month. This spree of killings carried on into early October and was carried out by civilians sometimes aided by army troops and swept the entire north. It has been described as the most painful and provocative incident leading to the Nigeria-Biafra War.

Aftermath 
The pogroms led to the mass movement of Igbo and other Eastern Nigerians back to Eastern Nigeria (it is estimated that more than one million Igbos returned to the eastern region). It also was the precursor to Ojukwu's declaration of Eastern Nigeria's secession from the federation as the Republic of Biafra, and the resulting Nigerian Civil War (1967–1970), which the Nigerian government declared as no victor, no vanquish.

See also
 Anti-Igbo sentiment
 Igbo culture
 Sabon Gari
 Asaba massacre

Bibliography
 Agbiboa, D. (2013). Ethno-religious Conflicts and the Elusive Quest for National Identity in Nigeria. Journal of Black Studies, 44(1), pp. 3–30.
 Anthony, D. (2014). ‘Ours is a war of survival’: Biafra, Nigeria and arguments about genocide, 1966–70. Journal of Genocide Research, 16(2–3), pp. 205–225
 Aro, G. & Ani, K. (2017). A Historical Review of Igbo Nationalism in the Nigerian Political Space. Journal of African Union Studies, 6(2/3), pp. 47–77.
 Omenka, N. (2010). Blaming The Gods: Christian Religious Propaganda In The Nigeria—Biafra War. The Journal of African History, 51(3), pp. 367–389.

References

External links 
 No regrets for the Asaba massacre of Igbo -Haruna
 2002 Statement from "Women of Biafra"
 Genocide is Totally Indefensible by Herbert Ekwe-Ekwe
 The Northern Counter-Coup Of 1966: The Full Story by Max Siollun

Mass murder in 1966
Igbo society
Ethnic riots
1966 in Nigeria
Pogroms
1966 riots
1960s massacres in Nigeria
Racism in Africa
1966 murders in Nigeria
Genocides in Africa
History of Northern Nigeria
Massacres in 1966
Anti-Igbo sentiment